List of schools in the Roman Catholic Diocese of Trenton.

K-12 schools
 Stuart Country Day School of the Sacred Heart*, Princeton
 Trenton Catholic Academy, Hamilton - Has lower school and upper school divisions
 *Operates independently with the concurrence of the Diocese.

6-12 schools
 Villa Victoria Academy*, Ewing Township
 *Operates independently with the concurrence of the Diocese.

High schools
 Christian Brothers Academy*, Lincroft
 Donovan Catholic High School, Toms River (known as St. Joseph High School until 1983 and Monsignor Donovan High School until 2014)
 Holy Cross Academy, Delran
 Mater Dei Prep*, Middletown
 Notre Dame High School, Lawrenceville
 Red Bank Catholic High School, Red Bank
 St. John Vianney High School, Holmdel
 St. Rose High School, Belmar
 Trinity Hall*, Tinton Falls
 *Operates independently with the concurrence of the Diocese.

Elementary schools
 Burlington County
 Our Lady of Good Counsel (Moorestown)
 Sacred Heart School (Mount Holly)
 St. Charles Borromeo Parish School (Cinnaminson)
 St. Joan of Arc School (Marlton)
 St. Mary of the Lakes School (Medford)
 St. Paul Grammar School (Burlington)

 Mercer County
 Our Lady of Sorrows School (Hamilton)
 St. Ann School (Lawrenceville)
 St. Gregory the Great Academy (Hamilton Square)
 St. Paul School (Princeton)
 St. Raphael School (Hamilton)

 Monmouth County
 Holy Cross Academy (Rumson)
 Mother Seton Academy (Howell Township) - Formed in 2019 by the merger of St. Aloysius and St. Veronica.
 Our Lady of Mount Carmel School (Asbury Park)
 St. Benedict School (Holmdel)
 St. Catharine School (Spring Lake)
 St. James Elementary School (Red Bank)
 St. Jerome School (West Long Branch)
 St. Leo the Great School (Lincroft)
 St. Mary School (Middletown)
 St. Rose Grammar School (Belmar)
 St. Rose of Lima School (Freehold)

 Ocean County
 St. Dominic School (Brick)
 St. Joseph Grammar School (Toms River)
 St. Mary Academy (Stafford Township, near Manahawkin CDP - From 1997, until 2019 it operated as All Saints Regional Catholic School and was collectively managed by five churches. In 2019 St. Mary Church of Barnegat took entire control of the school, which remained on the same Manahawkin campus, and changed its name. The other churches no longer operate the school but still may send students there. The other churches that formerly collectively operated the school include:  St. Elizabeth Ann Seton Church in Whiting, St. Francis of Assisi Church in Brant Beach, St. Pius X Church near Forked River CDP (in Lacey Township and adjacent to the Forked River CDP.), and St. Theresa Church in Little Egg Harbor. The five churches still participate in sending students to the school.
 St. Peter Grammar School (Point Pleasant)

 Private (non-diocesan) Schools
 Princeton Academy of the Sacred Heart (Princeton)

Former schools
 Monmouth County
 Holy Innocents School (Neptune Township) - Closed in 2019 as, while the school administration stated it would be sustainable at 200 students, it had only 93 students.
 St. Veronica School (Howell) - Merged into Mother Seton Academy in 2019.
 Ocean County
 St. Aloysius School (Jackson) - Merged into Mother Seton Academy in 2019.

References

Further reading

External links
 Diocese of Trenton

Education in Trenton, New Jersey
Schools
Trenton